Cape Fournier is a headland on Chatham Island, in New Zealand's Chatham Islands group. It is the southeasternmost point in the island, and is the closest point on the island to the second largest of the Chatham Islands, Pitt Island, which lies 20 kilometres to the south-southeast across Pitt Strait.

References

Fournier
Chatham Island